Miriam Kolodziejová and Markéta Vondroušová were the defending champions, however Kolodziejová was no longer eligible to play juniors and Vondroušová chose not to participate.

Anna Kalinskaya and Tereza Mihalíková won the title, defeating Dayana Yastremska and Anastasia Zarytska in the final, 6–1, 6–1.

Seeds

Draw

Finals

Top half

Bottom half

References 

Draw

Girls' Doubles
Australian Open, 2016 Girls' Doubles